Strugstad is a Norwegian surname.

Notable people
Notable people with this surname include:
 Oscar Sigvald Julius Strugstad (1851–1919), Norwegian military officer and politician
 Oscar Sigvald Strugstad (1887–1953), Norwegian military officer

References